Harlachinger Quellbach (also: Siebenbrunner Bächl) is a small river of Bavaria, Germany. It flows into the Auer Mühlbach, a branch of the Isar, in Munich-Harlaching.

See also
List of rivers of Bavaria

Rivers of Bavaria
Rivers of Germany

de:Auer Mühlbach#Zuflüsse